The Battle of Zephath, according to the Hebrew Bible, occurred during the period of 911-870 BCE, in the reign of King Asa of Judah. It was fought at the Valley of Zephath near Maresha, in modern-day Israel, between the armies of the Kingdom of Judah under the command of King Asa and that of the Kushites and ancient Egyptians under the command of Zerah the Cushite who, given the time frame with Asa's reign, may have been a military commander under Osorkon I. 

The warriors of Judah were victorious in the battle, utterly defeating the Egyptians and Kushites, which the Chronicler attributes to divine intervention, and Asa's forces collected a large volume of war spoils. Asa's forces pursued the enemy stragglers as far as the coastal city of Gerar, where they halted due to exhaustion. The result of the battle created peace between Judah and Egypt until the time of Josiah some centuries later, when the latter would again make encroachments in the region.

See also
Battle of Mount Zemaraim
Ancient Egypt
Kingdom of Israel (Samaria)

References

Zephath
10th century BC in the Kingdom of Judah
Zephath
9th century BC in the Kingdom of Judah